Jeremy Pascall (Born as Jeremy James Zuppinger, 1946 - 30 Aug 2001) was an English screenwriter, broadcaster, journalist and author.

He specialized in writing about humour and rock music, starting his career at the magazine New Musical Express. At 26 he moved on to be a producer at London's Capital Radio. He has written several books.

He died on 30 August 2001 from throat cancer.

Works
 The Illustrated History of Rock Music
 The Movies from 1930 to the present
 The Uncyclopaedia of Rock
 God - the Ultimate Autobiography, Angus and Robertson, London, 1987, 
 Story of Rock: Rock 'n Roll Is Here To Stay, Phoebus Publishing Co., New York, 1973/76

References

External links
 Obituary

2001 deaths
English male journalists
1946 births
English male non-fiction writers